Géza Imre (born 23 December 1974) is a Hungarian fencer, who has won four Olympic medals in the Épée competitions, a silver medal in 2004 Summer Olympics in Athens, a bronze medal in 1996 Summer Olympics in Atlanta and a silver medal in 2016 Summer Olympics in Rio de Janeiro. He was the 2015 world champion in men's épée in Moscow.

He is the husband of Beatrix Kökény, a Hungarian handballer.

Awards
 Hungarian Fencer of the Year (2): 1996, 2015
 Member of the Hungarian team of year: 1998
 National Defence awards, II.class (1998)
 Budapest Pro Urbe award (2016)

Orders and special awards
   Cross of Merit of the Republic of Hungary – Silver Cross (1996)
   Order of Merit of the Republic of Hungary – Knight's Cross (2004)
   Order of Merit of Hungary – Commander's Cross (2016)

References

External links
 
 
 
 
 

1974 births
Living people
Hungarian male épée fencers
Fencers at the 1996 Summer Olympics
Fencers at the 2004 Summer Olympics
Fencers at the 2008 Summer Olympics
Fencers at the 2012 Summer Olympics
Fencers at the 2016 Summer Olympics
Olympic fencers of Hungary
Olympic silver medalists for Hungary
Olympic bronze medalists for Hungary
Olympic medalists in fencing
Martial artists from Budapest
Medalists at the 1996 Summer Olympics
Medalists at the 2004 Summer Olympics
Medalists at the 2016 Summer Olympics
21st-century Hungarian people